The 2001 O'Byrne Cup was a Gaelic football competition played by the county teams of Leinster GAA.

The tournament was a straight knockout, with 10 teams. Kildare and Kilkenny did not compete. 

Meath were the winners, defeating Westmeath in the final at Cusack Park, Mullingar.

Results

References

External links
Leinster G.A.A. Results 2001

O'Byrne Cup
O'Byrne Cup